Second Name is a 2002 Spanish horror film based on 2001 horror novel Pact of the Fathers by Ramsey Campbell.

Plot
Daniella investigates her family's past in the wake of the suicide of her father. The plot gets to involves a sect called the Abrahamites, who sacrifice their first borns following an alternative interpretation of God's Will in the near-sacrifice of Isaac.

Cast
Erica Prior....Daniella
Denis Rafter....Simon Hastings
Craig Stevenson....Toby Harris
John O'Toole....Father Elias

Awards and nominations
Cinénygma - Luxembourg International Film Festival
2003: Nominated, "Grand Prize of European Fantasy Film in Gold"

Fantasporto
2003: Nominated, "Best Film"

Sitges Film Festival
2002: Won, "Grand Prize of European Fantasy Film in Silver"
2002: Nominated, "Best Film"

Turia Awards
2003: Won, "Best First Work" - Paco Plaza

External links
 
 

2002 films
Films based on British novels
Spanish horror films
2002 horror films
2000s English-language films
2000s Spanish films